For other people named John Platt, see John Platt.

John Platt (January 11, 1632 – November 6, 1705) was an early settler of Norwalk, Connecticut. He was a member of the General Court of the Colony of Connecticut from Norwalk in several sessions between 1678 and 1694.

He was the son of Richard Platt and Mary Wood.

He moved from Milford to Norwalk, and received grants of land there in 1660, 1663 and 1672.

He was a deacon of the church at Norwalk.

He was sergeant of the Norwalk Train Band.

In 1680 he was one of the three commissioners appointed to lay out the plantation north of Stamford.

In 1687, he was appointed one of the three commissioners chosen to lay out Danbury.

References 

1632 births
1705 deaths
Deacons
Deputies of the Connecticut General Assembly (1662–1698)
Politicians from Norwalk, Connecticut
People from Milford, Connecticut
People from Ware, Hertfordshire
English emigrants
Settlers of Connecticut